Conquista is a municipality located in the west of Minas Gerais, Brazil. The city belongs to the mesoregion of Triângulo Mineiro and Alto Paranaíba and to the microregion of Uberaba. Conquista became a municipality in 1912.

The distance to the state capital, Belo Horizonte, is 469 km. Neighboring municipalities are: Uberaba (to the northwest and west), Sacramento (to the north east), Refaina (to the south) and Igarapava (to the southeast). The southern boundary is formed by the Rio Grande.

The population was once much greater but decreased with the collapse of the coffee market in the early twentieth century and the later exodus of workers to build the new capital of Brasília in the 1960s.  In 1920 Conquista had 20,170 inhabitants; in 1950 there were 11,627; in 1980 there were 7,300, and in 2000 there were 6,101, of which 4,037 lived in the urban area.

The main economic activities are services, industry and agriculture.  Industry employed over 3,000 people, many of them in a sugar and alcohol factory.  The GDP in 2005 was approximately R$117 million, with 31 million reais from services, 30 million reais from industry, and 47 million reais from agriculture.  There were 300 rural producers on 32,000 hectares of land.  300 workers were employed by the industrial sector.  The land is very fertile and agricultural production is high.  125 farms had tractors (2006).  Approximately 900 persons were employed by agriculture.  The main crops were sugarcane (10,000 hectares planted in 2006)) and soybeans (8,700 hectares planted in 2006), but oranges, cotton, rice, beans and corn were also grown.  There were 28,000 head of cattle (2006).  There were 2 banks (2007) and 1,071 automobiles, giving a ratio of 6 inhabitants per automobile.

There were 6 health clinics and 1 hospital with 31 beds (2005).  Patients with more serious health conditions are transported to Uberaba, which is connected by good roads.  Educational needs were met by 4 primary schools, 1 middle school, and 5 pre-primary schools (2007).

Municipal Human Development Index: 0.779 (2000)
State ranking: 119 out of 853 municipalities 
National ranking: 1,081 out of 5,138 municipalities  
Literacy rate: 87%
Life expectancy: 71 (average of males and females)

In 2000 the per capita monthly income of R$268.00 was below the state and national average of R$276.00 and R$297.00 respectively.

The highest ranking municipality in Minas Gerais in 2000 was Poços de Caldas with 0.841, while the lowest was Setubinha with 0.568.  Nationally the highest was São Caetano do Sul in São Paulo with 0.919, while the lowest was Setubinha.  In more recent statistics (considering 5,507 municipalities) Manari in the state of Pernambuco has the lowest rating in the country—0,467—putting it in last place.

See also
List of municipalities in Minas Gerais

References

External links

Prefeitura de Conquista

Municipalities in Minas Gerais